The South Carolina Democratic Party is the affiliate of the Democratic Party in the U.S. state of South Carolina. It is headquartered in Columbia, South Carolina.

History
The Democratic Party thrived during the Second Party System between 1832 and the mid-1850s and was one of the causes of the collapse of the Whig Party.

Between 1880 and 1948, South Carolina's Democratic Party dominated state politics. The 1948 presidential election marked the winds of change as Strom Thurmond ran on behalf of the States' Rights Democratic Party (Dixiecrats). He accumulated 71% of the votes cast in South Carolina that year.

Nearly 100 years after the conclusion of the American Civil War (around 1949), the state was still preoccupied with racial tension, which muffled the debate about essentially all other issues. During this time, all politics revolved around the Democratic Party. Furthermore, a single faction typically dominated local politics. South Carolina was locked into the traditionalistic culture dominant throughout the South. Political change was often resisted by South Carolina's agrarian leaders. The agrarian leaders were middle-class farmers that were thought to maintain the status quo of the Democratic Party. In 1942, a party convention overwhelmingly voted to continue the all-white primary to prevent African-American influence. For much of South Carolina's history, the lower class was generally not allowed to vote.

A major shift began in South Carolina politics with President Lyndon B. Johnson's Civil Rights Act of 1964, with whites switching to the Republican Party.

Current elected officials
The South Carolina Democratic Party 
currently control none of the statewide offices and holds minorities in both the South Carolina Senate and House of Representatives. Democrats hold one of the state's seven U.S. House seats.

Members of Congress

U.S. Senate
Republicans have controlled both of South Carolina's seats in the U.S. Senate since 2004. Fritz Hollings was the last Democrat to represent South Carolina in the U.S. Senate. First elected in the 1966 special election, Hollings opted to retire instead of seeking a seventh full term. Superintendent of Education Inez Tenenbaum ran as the Democratic nominee in the 2004 election and was subsequently defeated by Republican challenger Jim DeMint.
 None

U.S. House of Representatives
Out of the seven seats South Carolina is apportioned in the U.S. House of Representatives, one is held by Democrats:

Statewide offices
 None

South Carolina has not elected any Democratic candidates to statewide office since 2006, when Jim Rex was elected as the Superintendent of Education.  In 2010, Rex opted not to run for re-election, instead running unsuccessfully for the Democratic nomination for Governor. Former United States Deputy Secretary of Education Frank Holleman ran as the Democratic nominee and was subsequently defeated by Republican challenger Mick Zais.

State legislative leaders
 Senate Minority Leader: Brad Hutto
 House Minority Leader: Todd Rutherford

Officers and staff
As of July 2019, the state party officers were:
 Chair: Trav Robertson, Jr.
 1st Vice Chairman: Lessie Price
 2nd Vice Chairman: Anthony B. Thompson Jr.
 3rd Vice Chairman: Jalen Elrod
 Secretary: Joyce Rose-Harris
 Treasurer: Kendra Dove

State Party Staff:
 Executive Director: Jay Parmley
 Finance Director: Ellen Stankiewicz
 Communications Coordinator: Grace Whaley
 Political Director: Angela Clyburn

Members of the Democratic National Committee
Three members of the South Carolina Democratic Party also serve on the Democratic National Committee. These are:
 Bre Maxwell
 Carol Fowler 
 Clay Middleton

See also
 Progressive Democratic Party (South Carolina)
 South Carolina Republican Party
 South Carolina Green Party

References

External links
 South Carolina Democratic Party
 Democratic Party of South Carolina Records at the University of South Carolina's South Carolina Political Collections
 South Carolina Young Democrats
 South Carolina High School Democrats

 
South Carolina
Democratic Party